Ebenezer Cunningham (7 May 1881 in Hackney, London – 12 February 1977)
was a British mathematician who is remembered for his research and exposition at the dawn of special relativity.

Biography
Cunningham went up to St John's College, Cambridge in 1899 and graduated Senior Wrangler in 1902, winning the Smith's Prize in 1904.

In 1904, as a lecturer at the University of Liverpool, he began work on a new theorem in relativity with fellow lecturer Harry Bateman. They brought the methods of inversive geometry into electromagnetic theory with their transformations (spherical wave transformation):
Each four-dimensional solution [to Maxwell's equations] could then be inverted in a four-dimensional hypersphere of pseudo-radius K in order to produce a new solution. Central to Cunningham's paper was the demonstration that Maxwell's equations retained their form under these transformations.

He worked with Karl Pearson in 1907 at University College London.
Cunningham married Ada Collins in 1908.

In August 1911 he returned to St John's College where he made his career. When drafted for the war in 1915 he did alternative service growing food and in an office at the YMCA. He held a university lectureship from 1926 to 1946.

His book The Principle of Relativity (1914) was one of the first treatises in English about special relativity, along with those by Alfred Robb and Ludwik Silberstein. He followed with Relativity and the Electron Theory (1915) and Relativity, Electron Theory and Gravitation (1921). McCrea writes that Cunningham had doubts whether general relativity produced "physical results adequate return for mathematical elaboration."

He was an ardent pacifist, strongly religious, a member of Emmanuel United Reformed Church, Cambridge and chairman of the Congregational Union of England and Wales for 1953–54.

Works
 1914: The Principle of Relativity from Internet Archive.

See also
 Conformal group of spacetime

Notes

References
 William McCrea (1978), "Ebenezer Cunningham", Bulletin of the London Mathematical Society 10: 116–126 subscription required.
 Andrew Warwick (2003), Masters of Theory: Cambridge and the Rise of Mathematical Physics, University of Chicago Press, pp. 409–36.

External links

 Oral history interview transcript with Ebenezer Cunningham on 19 June 1963, American Institute of Physics, Niels Bohr Library & Archives
 
 

1881 births
1977 deaths
Alumni of St John's College, Cambridge
Fellows of St John's College, Cambridge
20th-century British mathematicians
People educated at Dame Alice Owen's School
British relativity theorists
Senior Wranglers